Pârlita may refer to several entities in Romania:

Pârlita, a tributary of the Taița in Tulcea County
Pârlita, the former name of Victoria village, Nufăru Commune, Tulcea County

See also 
 Pîrlița (disambiguation)